Years in the Making is a two-CD compilation album by Loudon Wainwright III released on September 14, 2018, by StorySound Records. The album brings together 42 songs spanning Wainwright's career, including home and live recordings, demos, studio outtakes, and interview pieces. The set, released in a hardbound book, features 60 pages of liner notes, art, photos, and documents.

The album is arranged roughly by topic and chronology.  Its tracks, most of which were previously unreleased, are divided into seven "chapters": Folk, Rocking Out and Kids on disc one and Love Hurts, Miscellany, Hollywood and The Big Picture on disc two. 
Years in the Making was co-produced by Wainwright and Dick Connette, who produced High Wide & Handsome, Wainwright's 2009 tribute to legendary banjo player Charlie Poole.

Track listing

Notes

2018 compilation albums
Loudon Wainwright III albums